Jungle Blues is the fourth album by Australian Blues musician C. W. Stoneking.

AT the ARIA Music Awards of 2009, he was notated for ARIA Award for Best Blues and Roots Album, ARIA Award for Best Independent Release, ARIA Award for Best Male Artist and ARIA Award for Best Cover Art, eventually winning 'Best Blues and Roots Album' for Jungle Blues.

At the AIR Awards of 2009, Stoneking was nominated for Best Independent Album, Best Independent Blues/Roots Album, and Independent Artist of the Year, with Jungle Blues winning the award for Best Independent Blues/Roots Album. Jungle Blues was also shortlisted in the 2008 Australian Music Prize.

Track listing
 "Jungle Blues" – 3:57
 "Talkin Lion Blues" – 4:32
 "Jungle Lullaby" – 4:49
 "Brave Son of America" – 3:40
 "Jailhouse Blues" – 4:33
 "Housebound Blues" – 3:37
 "I Heard the Marchin of the Drum" – 3:53
 "The Love Me or Die" – 3:51
 "Early in the Mornin" – 3:32
 "The Greatest Liar" – 3:37

Charts

References

2008 albums
C. W. Stoneking albums
ARIA Award-winning albums